Katranide may refer to:

 Katranide I, queen of Armenia 885–890, wife of Ashot I Mets
 Katranide II, queen of Armenia 990–1020, wife of Gagik I